Prem Nagar is a "Nagar panchayat" area of Pilkha constituency of Chhattisgarh state in India and is a part of the Surajpur District. Prem Nagar is nearly 51 km northeast from Surajpur and 91 km from Ambikapur, which is its nearest big city.

See also
 Surajpur District

Cities and towns in Surajpur district